The Catacomb of Phaneromeni Church in Larnaca, Cyprus is a catacomb. It has been dated to the 8th century. It has been used as a church. Built above it, is a church from the early 20th century—the Phaneromeni Church.

The (top) stairs leading to the entrance of the catacomb, are outside the Phaneromeni Church—located around 7 meters from the east wall of the church building.

The Phaneromeni Tomb is also known as the Saint Phaneromeni Rock-cut Tomb.

It is a rock cavern with two chambers. The structure suggests that it once was a pagan tomb, possibly dating back to Phoenician times. The place is credited with various magical properties: thus those who suffer from headaches or other diseases walk three times round it and leave pieces of clothing or tufts of their hair on the grill in front of the south window.

See also
 Faneromeni Monastery in Lefkadas (Greek Wikipedia)
 Faneromeni Monastery in Salamina (Greek Wikipedia)

References

Tombs in Cyprus
Churches in Larnaca
Catacombs
Rock-cut tombs
Archaeological sites in Cyprus